Count Anders Torstenson (20 January 16418 November 1686), Swedish statesman, son of Lennart Torstenson and member of the Privy Council, was from 1674 to 1681 Governor-General of Estonia. The family became extinct in the male line in 1727.

References

1641 births
1686 deaths
Governors-General of Sweden
Swedish nobility
17th-century Swedish politicians
Members of the Privy Council of Sweden